Ghar Some (also spelled Ghar Sam) is a limestone cave at an altitude of 1,700 meters of Khajeh Ghanbar Mountain (Imamzadeh on top of the mountain) in Namij area of Nam-e nik village, Iran. The natural cave is made of lime, which has expanded and expanded based on the flow of water through the limestone rocks. Sam Cave is the second deepest cave in Iran.

History 
So far, 21 wells have been discovered in Sam Cave with the efforts of mountaineering groups, of which 17 wells have been discovered by Qaboos Gonbad Mountaineering Group. 

Inside the cave are remnants of pottery from ancient times and skeletons. The mouth of the cave is located in an ancient site. Remains of human skeletons are also found in the opening vestibules of the cave. Sam Cave is the second deepest and second most dangerous cave in Iran. The name of this cave (Sam) in the local language means hole and cave.

On the way to the entrance of Sam Cave, there is encounter a narrow and narrow path which is known as "Crab Face", but unlike Cancer on other caves in our country, the bottlenecks of this cave are not complete and it is not even possible to turn our head and most of the way should be one way. Another problem that makes this cave dangerous for cavers is the excessive temperature drop in the cave. In fact, from well 19 onwards, the air temperature reaches 6 degrees Celsius.

Pictures

References

External links 

 Pictures of Som's Cave
 Caving in Iran

Caves of Iran